The Lizhou Dam is a run-of-the-river hydroelectric arch dam on the Muli River in Muli Tibetan Autonomous County, Sichuan Province, China. 

The primary purpose of the dam is hydroelectric power generation, with its 355 MW power station located 14.5 km to the southeast of the dam.

Preliminary construction on the project began in 2009 and the superstructures were approved in 2011. Pouring of roller-compacted concrete for the dam began in 2012. The dam began to impound its reservoir in December 2015. Lizhou Dam started producing its power in 2016, when the whole facility was commissioned.

See also

List of dams and reservoirs in China
List of tallest dams in China

References

Dams in China
Liangshan Yi Autonomous Prefecture
Arch dams
Roller-compacted concrete dams
Hydroelectric power stations in Sichuan